The Order of Aftab (Persian: نشان آفتاب trans. Neshan-e Aftab), also known as the Order of the Sun, was a decoration founded by Nasser al-Din Shah Qajar, the Shah of Iran, in February 1873, before his first visit to various European states. The order came in two classes, the first class restricted to female sovereigns or consorts of reigning rulers and the second class to princesses and ladies of high rank, and those deserving of special recognition or signs of conspicuous appreciation by the Shah. In 1967 during the reign of the Pahlavi dynasty the statues of the order had changed, there changes included the name to the Order of Aryamehr, the insignia and the eligibility of receiving the order.

First Class insignia

The insignia of the first class consists of a breast star, sash, and sash badge. The badge is a round disk in platinum, bearing a full-face image of a female sun (aftab), fully enameled in natural colours and surrounded by a narrow raised band of platinum. The platinum band garlanded by a wide circlet completely encrusted in eighteen diamonds, edged by a further narrow raised band in platinum. Around the top half of the platinum band, a sunburst arranged in a fan-like design of seventeen separate rays, eight with tips shaped like Gothic arches and nine swallows tails, all completely encrusted in diamonds. Attached to the uppermost ray of the sunburst, a tie-ring encrusted in brilliants.

The breast star of the first class is very similar to the badge, but larger, and consists of a sunburst with thirty-two separate rays, all encrusted in diamonds and completely surrounding the central disk with its wide platinum band and circlet of diamonds.

Recipients of the first class wore the badge suspended from a grand cordon of pink moiré, edged with narrow border stripes of green, pink, and green. The sash draped over the left shoulder and across the breast, with the badge resting below the right hip.

Second Class insignia
The insignia of the second class also consists of breast star, sash and sash badge. The badge is similar to the first class but in enamel and brilliants, instead of diamonds. Unlike the first class, the breast star of the second class is a closer copy of the badge, but with pendant diamonds from the two horizontal lower arms. The sunburst is semicircular with seventeen rays, surrounding only the top half of the central disk with its wide platinum band and circlet of diamonds.

Recipients of the second class wore the badge suspended from the same grand cordon, and in the same manner, as those of the first class.

Replacement
By the fall of the Qajar dynasty and in the era of Reza Shah Pahlavi, this order was replaced by the Order of Khorshid (another Persian word for 'Sun') in 1939.

References

Civil awards and decorations of Iran
Orders of chivalry for women
1873 establishments in Iran